HMS Port Royal was the former French armed merchant vessel Comte de Maurepas, which the British captured in 1778. The  British armed her with 18 guns and took her into the Royal Navy under her new name. The Spanish captured her at the Siege of Pensacola in 1781.

Capture
On 13 October 1778, the squadron under Captain Joseph Deane in  captured Comte de Maurepas off Cap-François on 13 October 1778. Comte de Maurepas was of 500 tons burthen (bm), was armed with eight guns, and had a crew of 32 men under Charles Bailly, master. She had been carrying a cargo of bricks and bale goods from Nantes.

Rear-Admiral Parker ordered her purchase. She was purchased on 8 December at a cost of £4,900. The British re-measured her as 463 tons (bm), armed her with eighteen 6-pounder guns and a dozen swivel guns; as Port Royal, she was commissioned under Commander Michael John Everitt on 1 January 1779  with a complement of 125 men.

By the start of June 1779, Everitt had been succeeded in charge of Port Royal by Commander John Cowling, who remained in command until December 1779. (Deane died on 12 January 1780). The British gave chase, during which a chance shot from Prudentes stern guns killed Everitt and a sailor. The British captured , which they took into service under her existing name.

Fate
Port Royal, came under the command of Commander Timothy Kelly on 13 January 1780.

In 1781 he sailed to Pensacola to assist the British forces there, which were under siege. The Siege of Pensacola lasted from 9 March 1781 to 8 May. On 10 March the Spaniards captured a boat and nine men from Port Royal who had gone foraging to Rose Island. On 23 March, Kelly was ordered to bring his crew ashore to help man the shore defenses. The plan was to destroy the sloop if necessary, but in the interim the British put some of their Spanish prisoners aboard to keep them out of the hands of Britain's Indian allies. Unfortunately, on 1 April the Spanish sent in some boats that captured Port Royal without resistance. On 4 May one of Port Royals crew was badly wounded by a cannon ball; he later died. Another of her crew was killed two days later.

The last Spanish assault on 8 May cost Port Royal Midshipman John Blair and 12 seaman killed, and five seamen wounded. Three seamen took the opportunity to desert. All these casualties occurred in the advanced redoubt. The British formally capitulated on 10 May 1781 and the Spanish seized Fort George and with it western Florida.

In his report, Major-General John Campbell, the British commander, singled out Lieutenant William Hargood, who had joined Port Royal in January 1780, for his service in command of the Royal Navy redoubt at Fort George. The Spanish took their British prisoners to Havana, and then returned them to the British in New York in an exchange for Spanish prisoners of war.

Notes, citations, and references
Notes

Citations

References
 
Feldman, Lawrence H. (2007) Colonization and Conquest: British Florida in the Eighteenth Century. (Genealogical Publishing).
 
Nelson, Viscount Horatio Nelson (1845) The dispatches and letters of Vice Admiral Lord Viscount Nelson: with notes, Volume 1. (H. Colburn).

1770s ships
Ships of the Royal Navy
Captured ships